The Righter/Kiekhaefer O-45 was an air-cooled, two-stroke aircraft engine of flat-twin configuration, used extensively for powering target drones in the late 1940s.

Designed by the Righter Manufacturing Company, the O-45 was also built by the Kiekhaefer Corporation and the Menasco Motors Company.

Variants
O-45-1
  version
O-45-3
  version
O-45-35
 Navy version of O-45-3

Applications
 Beecraft Wee Bee
 Frankfort OQ-16/TD3D
 Globe KD3G Snipe
 Globe KD4G Quail
 OQ-15
 Radioplane OQ-6
 Radioplane OQ-14
 Radioplane OQ-17/KDR
 Radioplane TDD
 ULM 811 Ultra Cruiser Ultavia

Specifications (O-45-1)

See also

References

Boxer engines
1940s aircraft piston engines
Two-stroke aircraft piston engines